The Two Hundred Block West Franklin Street Historic District is a national historic district located at Richmond, Virginia. It is located between downtown and the Fan district. The district encompasses 13 contributing buildings built during the 19th century and in a variety of popular architectural styles including Greek Revival, Federal, Beaux-Arts, and Queen Anne.  Many of the dwellings have been converted to commercial use. Notable buildings include Queen Anne Row (1891), the Carter-Mayo House designed by Carrère and Hastings, the Cole Diggs House, the Smith-Palmer House, the Ida Schoolcraft House, the Price House, the A. S. Smith House, and the T. Seddon Bruce House.

It was added to the National Register of Historic Places in 1977, with a boundary increase in 1994.

References

External links
Palmer House, 211 West Franklin Street, Richmond, Independent City, VA: 1 photo at Historic American Buildings Survey

Historic American Buildings Survey in Virginia
Historic districts on the National Register of Historic Places in Virginia
Federal architecture in Virginia
Greek Revival houses in Virginia
Queen Anne architecture in Virginia
Beaux-Arts architecture in Virginia
Buildings and structures in Richmond, Virginia
National Register of Historic Places in Richmond, Virginia